Namma Veedu Vasanta Bhavan is a chain of vegetarian restaurants headquartered in Egmore, Chennai, India, started in 1969.

History
Vasanta Bhavan restaurant was started in Trichy by Patron Mr. A. Muthukrishnan. Mr.A.Muthukrishnan started branches in Chennai. The chain of restaurants handled by Mr. M. Ravi was changed to Namma Veedu Vasanta Bhavan chain of restaurants. He is also the Vice President of the Tamil Nadu Hotels Association.

ISO 22000:2005
Vasanta Bhavan has been accredited with the ISO 22000:2005 quality certificate from QMS, a UK-based company.
For ISO 22000:2005 Certification Click Here

The Spring Hotel
The Spring is Chennai's first all-suite hotel that is owned by superstar Rajinikanth who leased out the restaurant to Vasanta Bhavan.

Catering division
Apart from the restaurant division, Namma Veedu Vasanta Bhavan also undertakes catering orders for individuals and corporates. A Food and Beverage Manager assisted by a team of chefs, look after the health aspects. The committee not only works on the taste and the quality but also works on the nutrition value. Namma Veedu Vasanta Bhavan is also operating as the official caterers at companies such as Mahindra Satyam, Sutherland Global Services Limited, FL Smidth, Siemens Shared Services and the HCL Technologies.

Branches in Chennai
 Egmore
 Egmore ll
 Mylapore
 Tambaram
 Vadapalani Arcot Road
 100 feet road, Vadapalani
 Nungambakkam
 Medavakkam
 Vikravandi
 Maduravoyal
 Phoenix Market City, Velachery
 Neelankarai
 Chromepet
 Villupuram

See also
 List of vegetarian restaurants

References

External links
 Official website
 , an article in The Hindu Business Line
 , Archives of Vasanta Bhavan
 , Reviews about Namma Veedu-Vasanta Bhavan
 , NDTV's program about Namma Veedu Vasanta Bhavan

Restaurants in Chennai
Restaurant chains in India
Vegetarian restaurants in India
Restaurants established in 1969
1969 establishments in Tamil Nadu
Catering and food service companies of India